Anthony Michael Romaniw (born September 15, 1991 in Hamilton, Ontario) is a Canadian track and field athlete competing in the middle-distance events, predominantly the 800m event. He competed in the 800 metres at the 2015 Pan American Games in Toronto, where he finished 15th. He represented his country at the 2016 Summer Olympics without reaching the semifinals.

At St. Thomas More Catholic Secondary School, Romaniw was a four sport star in track and cross country where he was the MVP on both teams, badminton and was the captain of the hockey team three times.  He ran two years at Dartmouth College before moving back home to finish at the University of Guelph.

International competitions

References

1991 births
Living people
Athletes (track and field) at the 2015 Pan American Games
Pan American Games track and field athletes for Canada
Athletes from Hamilton, Ontario
Canadian male middle-distance runners
Athletes (track and field) at the 2016 Summer Olympics
Olympic track and field athletes of Canada
Competitors at the 2013 Summer Universiade